Ballad Collection may refer to:

 Ballad Collection (X Japan album), 1997
 Ballad Collection (Lana Lane album), 1998